Rubidium cyanide (chemical formula: RbCN) is the rubidium salt of hydrogen cyanide. It is a white solid, easily soluble in water, with a smell reminiscent of bitter almonds, and somewhat similar in appearance to sugar. Rubidium cyanide has chemical properties similar to potassium cyanide, and is similarly very toxic.

Production 
Rubidium cyanide can be synthesized by the reaction of hydrogen cyanide and rubidium hydroxide in alcohol or ether:
HCN + RbOH → RbCN + H2O.

References 

Cyanides
Rubidium compounds